Núria is a Catalan girls' name taken from the Virgin of Núria, a Marian shrine located in the eponymous valley, the Vall de Núria. The name also occurs in Spanish without the accent as Nuria, given that the Spanish name of the valley is el valle de Nuria.

Etymology and history 
The placename, Núria, is believed to be of Basque origin according to Joan Coromines, and related to the word Norra, a variant of Andorra, and meaning "place between valleys."  

The name Nuria has also been linked to the Arabic unisex name Nur meaning light.

The name, originally Mare de Déu de Núria, derives from Marian devotion to the Virgin of Nuria (Catalan Mare de Déu de Núria). The name is very popular in Catalonia, especially in the comarques of Ripollès—where the sanctuary is located in the municipality of Queralbs—Priorat, Pallars Jussà, Osona, Noguera, Conca de Barberà, and Cerdanya.

Popularity 
In 2007 it was the seventh most common female name in Catalonia, with its most recent peak of popularity recorded in the decade of the 1970s. The Saint's day is September 8, for Our Lady of Nuria.

Notable people with the name
 Núria Añó (1973, Lleida) Spanish writer and novelist
 Núria Aliaga-Alcalde, Spanish chemist
 Nuria Cabanillas (1980) Spanish rhythmic gymnast and Olympic champion
 Nuria Bages (1955, Monterrey) Mexican actress
 Nuria Benzal (1985) Spanish handball player
 Nuria Bermúdez (1980) Spanish football agent and actress
 Núria Camón (1978, Terrassa) Spanish field hockey player who competed in the 2000 Summer Olympics.
 Nuria Domínguez (1974, Toronto) Canadian-born Spanish competition rower
 Núria Espert (1935, Barcelona) Spanish actress
 Nuria Fernández (1976, Lucerne, Switzerland) Spanish middle-distance runner
 Nuria Fernández Gómez, "Nuria Fergó," (Nerja, 1979) Spanish singer and actress
 Nuria González (1962, Málaga) Spanish actress
 Nuria Llagostera Vives (1980, Majorca) Spanish tennis player
 Núria López, Spanish chemistry professor
 Nuria Lopez Bigas, Spanish biologist
 Núria Madruga (1980) Portuguese actress and model
 Nuria Martínez (1984) Spanish professional basketball player in the WNBA
 Nuria Moreno (1975, Madrid) Spanish field hockey player
 Nuria Olivé (1968, Barcelona) Spanish field hockey player
 Nuria Párrizas Díaz (born 1991, Spanish tennis player
 Nuria Quevedo (born 1938), Spanish-German painter
 Núria Pradas (born 1954), Spanish philologist and writer
 Nuria Pomares (Madrid) Spanish ballet dancer
 Núria Rial, Spanish soprano
 Nuria Torray (1934–2004) Spanish film, television, and theatre actress
 Nuria Zufía Spanish footballer

References

Spanish feminine given names